Edmund Moeller (born September 10, 1934) is an American former sports shooter. He competed in the 50 metre running target event at the 1972 Summer Olympics.

References

1934 births
Living people
American male sport shooters
Olympic shooters of the United States
Shooters at the 1972 Summer Olympics
People from Lavaca County, Texas
Sportspeople from Texas